Lester White (July 25, 1907 - December 4, 1958) was an American cinematographer.

Selected filmography
The Prizefighter and the Lady (1933)
Laughing Boy (1934)
A Wicked Woman (1934)
Society Doctor (1934)
Times Square Lady (1935)
Calm Yourself (1935)
We Went to College (1936)
The Longest Night (1936)
The Murder Man (1936)
The Women Men Marry (1937)
You're Only Young Once (1937)
Judge Hardy and Son (1939)
Andy Hardy Gets Spring Fever (1938)
Love Finds Andy Hardy (1938)
Judge Hardy's Children (1938)
Yellow Jack (1938)
Calling Dr. Kildare (1939)
Henry Goes Arizona (1939)
Babes on Broadway (1941)
Life Begins for Andy Hardy (1941)
A Yank on the Burma Road (1942)
The Courtship of Andy Hardy (1942)
Miss Annie Rooney (1942)
White Savage (1943)
Sherlock Holmes in Washington (1943)
Blonde Fever (1944)
Andy Hardy's Blonde Trouble (1944)
The Hidden Eye (1945)
The Spirit of West Point (1947)
The Fuller Brush Man (1948)
Jungle Jim (1948)
The Good Humor Man (1950)
Harem Girl (1952)
White Lightning (1953)
The 49th Man (1953)
The Stranger Wore a Gun (1953)
Women's Prison (1955)
Top Gun (1955)
The Monster That Challenged the World (1957)

References

1907 births
1958 deaths
American cinematographers